Holme Valley War Memorial is a war memorial in the grounds of the Holme Valley Memorial Hospital Holmfirth, West Yorkshire, in England. It was unveiled in July 1921, by Colonel H. R. Headlam (Rtd), who had previously commanded the 5th Battalion, Duke of Wellington’s West Riding Regiment.

The memorial consists of a simple cross with the names of fallen soldiers inscribed on it.

Notes

Holmfirth
Monuments and memorials in West Yorkshire
British military memorials and cemeteries
Buildings and structures completed in 1921
World War I memorials in England